Paso del Norte may refer to:

El Paso–Juárez-Las Cruces, a binational metropolitan area
El Paso, Texas, which grew from a small village called El Paso del Norte
 Paso del Norte, the name until 1888 of Ciudad Juárez, Mexico
Hotel Paso del Norte, a historic hotel in El Paso, Texas
Paso del Norte Health Foundation, an organization in El Paso, Texas
Paso del Norte International Bridge, a bridge between Mexico and the United States
Paso Del Norte Group, a civil organization in El Paso, Texas
Paso del Norte (opera), a 2011 Mexican opera